The Deed is an American reality television docu-series which airs on CNBC. The series follows real estate developer Sidney Torres from New Orleans using the finances and expertise to help other property investors with struggling projects by investing in their development. The series spawned a spinoff titled The Deed: Chicago, which follows Sean Conlon in Chicago. It is produced by Cineflix.

The series has been described as "a real estate version of The Profit," a similar show also broadcast by CNBC, and was inspired by a variety of property flipping shows on HGTV and A&E.

On April 16, 2019, it was announced that the second season of The Deed: Chicago would premiere on September 19, 2019.

Broadcast
The series premiered in America on CNBC on March 1, 2017. Torres held a viewing party in New Orleans as the premiere went to air.

The program was renewed for a second season which premiered on June 13, 2018.

Episodes

Season 1 (2017)

Season 2 (2018)

References

External links

2010s American television news shows
2017 American television series debuts
2018 American television series endings
CNBC original programming
English-language television shows
Television series by Cineflix